First Base was a German Eurodance group formed in 1995. It was created by producer Michael Gleim  DJ Wondermike and featured vocalist Kristina (Tina) Safrany a.k.a. Viktoria and rapper Michael Williams a.k.a. MC Flash. They released three singles, "Love is Paradise", "Can You Keep a Secret", and "Follow Me". The group was highly successful in Canada, with their first two singles reaching number-one on the Canadian RPM Dance Chart and the latter peaking at number 6.

Discography

Singles

References

German Eurodance groups
German dance music groups
Musical groups established in 1995
Musical groups from Frankfurt